In 1940, The Billboard began compiling and publishing the National Best Selling Retail Records chart. Debuting in the issue dated July 27, it marked the beginning of the magazine's nationwide tracking of record sales in the United States. Initially titled the "National List of Best Selling Retail Records", the weekly ten-position chart was tabulated using sales figures received from a selection of merchants across the country. Prior to its introduction, The Billboard had produced lists ranking music by various metrics such as performance in vaudeville venues, jukebox plays, sheet music sales, and regional airplay.

The first National Best Selling Retail Records number-one single was "I'll Never Smile Again" by Tommy Dorsey and His Orchestra. Featuring vocals by Frank Sinatra and the vocal group the Pied Pipers, the song topped the chart for twelve consecutive weeks and elevated Sinatra to national popularity.

Chart history

See also
1940 in music

References

1940
1940 record charts
1940 in American music